The spatula-barbeled catfish (Phyllonemus typus) is a species of claroteid catfish endemic to Lake Tanganyika on the border of the Democratic Republic of the Congo, Tanzania, Burundi and Zambia. It grows to a length of 8.8 cm (3.5 inches) TL.

References
 

Phyllonemus
Claroteidae
Fish described in 1906
Taxonomy articles created by Polbot